The Slow Norris is a British children's television programme that aired on CITV from 4 September 1995 to 23 December 1999.  The programme portrayed moral tales and fables through various anthropomorphized creatures. The show was produced by HTV and Hat Trick Productions for CITV.

There was also a version produced for American television by Hollywood Ventures which ran on PBS in the fall of 1997.

Main characters
 The Slow Norris (voiced by Nick Ryan) - The lead character is a large, hairy Slow loris-like creature who - although not very clever (and somewhat naive) - is willing to learn and participate in stories and activities. The Slow Norris lives in a cave-like dwelling within a forest.
 Allie (voiced by Buddie Maddicott) - As the only human character, Allie is the group's natural leader. She travels through the woods on her bicycle to visit the Slow Norris. Allie has a magic book which shows Slow Norris what things are or an animated story featuring Jane the Fairy and her frog Ferdy. Allie is voiced by Buddie Maddicott, a relation of the show's producer Dan Maddicott
 Ben Beetle (voiced by Gary Martin) - Ben Beetle is a wise insect who spends much of his time sat on a toadstool with his walking stick.
 Walter the Worm - Walter the Worm lives in a house made of mud and talks with a slight stutter.
 Jane the Fairy - An animated fairy who only appears in Allie's magic book. She wears a lilac dress and a leaf hat.
 Ferdy the Frog - He is Jane's froggy companion. He's very sensitive and bit naughty sometimes.
 Hodgehug - A baby hedgehog.
 Stork - A white stork. She appears in "Things That Fly" and is only seen throughout the 1996 series.

Episodes
Episodes include one where Allie shows the Slow Norris a story of someone baking a cake, in her magic book. In another, the Slow Norris is putting off tidying the cave where he lives. Allie shows him a story involving a fairy named Jane whose house has a leak due to a hole in the roof. Jane's friend, a frog named Ferdy is supposed to fix the roof, however doesn't. The pair go out on a train journey to have a picnic with Jane's gran; they return home to find it has rained and Jane's house is now flooded. This persuades the Slow Norris to tidy his cave. In one episode, Walter the Worm loses his tail cosy, only to find later on that the Slow Norris has it.
In a later series, the opening music gained lyrics sung by Allie.

Series 1 (1995)
01 Making Friends - 4 September 1995

02 Colours - 11 September 1995

03 Things With Wheels - 18 September 1995

04 Being Yourself - 25 September 1995

05 Food 2 October - 1995

06 Birthdays 9 October - 1995

07 Feeling Poorly 16 October - 1995

08 Schools 23 October - 1995

09 Where We Live 30 October - 1995

10 Being Kind 07 November - 1995

11 Games 14 November - 1995

12 Big And Small 21 November - 1995

13 Being Teased 28 November - 1995

14 2 Legs 4 Legs 6 Legs And No Legs 4 December - 1995

15 The Slow Norris’s Party 11 December - 1995

Series 2 (1996)
01 Things That Fly 9 September 1996

02 Day And Night 16 September - 1996

03 Keeping Fit 23 September - 1996

04 Being Worried 30 September - 1996

05 Penfriends 7 October - 1996

06 Things That We Wear 14 October - 1996

07 Making Music 21 October - 1996

08 Things That Grow 28 October - 1996

09 Bones 4 November - 1996

10 Things That Swim 11 November - 1996

11 Friends And Relations 18 November - 1996

12 The Shape Of Things 25 November - 1996

13 Putting 2 December - 1996

14 Putting Things Off 9 December - 1996

15 The Four Seasons 16 December - 1996

Series 3 (1997)
01 Pictures And Stories 1 September - 1997

02 Holidays 8 September - 1997

03 Babies 15 September - 1997

04 Harvest Time 22 September - 1997

05 Dreams 29 September - 1997

06 Being Different 6 October - 1997

07 Water 13 October - 1997

08 Decorating 20 October - 1997

09 Keeping Secrets 27 October - 1997

10 Money 3 November - 1997

11 Episode 11 10 November - 1997

12 Episode 12 17 November - 1997

13 Episode 13 24 November - 1997

14 Episodes 14 1 December - 1997

15 Episode 15 8 December - 1997

16 Sizes 15 December - 1997

Puppeteers
 David Barclay -
 Mike Quinn -
 Karen Prell - Slow Norris (facial puppeteer), Walter the Worm
 Helena Smee
 Katherine Smee -
 Michael Bayliss - Allie
 Rebecca Nagan
 Jeremy Stockwell
 Simon Buckley
 Alison McGowen
 Rebecca Clow 
 Margaret O’Flaherty

Voices
 Buddie Maddicott - Allie
 Gary Martin - Ben Beetle
 Nick Ryan - Slow Norris

References

1990s British children's television series
1995 British television series debuts
1999 British television series endings
British children's fantasy television series
British television series with live action and animation
British television shows featuring puppetry
English-language television shows
ITV children's television shows
Television series by Hat Trick Productions
Television series by ITV Studios
Television shows produced by Harlech Television (HTV)